Parr (1893 - 3 November 1969) was an Inuit artist. He lived a traditional Inuit lifestyle until 1961, when he settled in Cape Dorset because of declining health and a hunting accident.

Biography
Parr was born in 1893 on Southern Baffin Island, near Cape Dorset, Northwest Territories (now Nunavut). He had two sons, Nuna Parr and Peter Parr, who are also artists. His wife, Eleeshushe Parr, was also an Inuit artist.

Work
In Cape Dorset, Parr began to draw and make stonecut relief prints. He created over 2,000 works in the next eight years. These are mainly images of hunting scenes, although Shamanic subjects are also depicted. In 1977 one of his prints was featured on a Canadian postage stamp.

His work is included in the permanent collections of several museums, including  the National Gallery of Canada,  the Musée national des beaux-arts du Québec, the University of Michigan Museum of Art, the Canadian Museum of History, the Dennos Museum Center, the National Museum of the American Indian, the British Museum, and the Museum of Modern Art.

References

External links
 Timeline of works in the database of the Centre for Contemporary Canadian Art
 Entry on the Union List of Artist Names

Inuit printmakers
1893 births
1969 deaths
Inuit from the Northwest Territories
People from Kinngait
20th-century Canadian printmakers